Pathfinder Reservoir is located in the U.S. state of Wyoming on the North Platte River between Casper and Rawlins. It sits 47 miles (76 km) southwest of Casper, in Carbon County and Natrona County. The shoreline consists of 117 miles (188 km). Much of the water used to serve the 335,000 acre (1360 km2) North Platte Project is stored here. Some of the water in the reservoir is released to satisfy other water rights and to operate power plants downstream of the reservoir. Much of the Pathfinder Reservoir is included in the Pathfinder National Wildlife Refuge. Pathfinder Reservoir is the site of the only established population of the Macedonian Ohrid Trout (S. letnica) in the United States.

Climate

According to the Köppen Climate Classification system, Pathfinder Reservoir has a cold semi-arid climate, abbreviated "BSk" on climate maps.

See also
List of largest reservoirs of Wyoming

References

External links

Pathfinder Reservoir bottom topography map

Reservoirs in Wyoming
Lakes of Carbon County, Wyoming
Lakes of Natrona County, Wyoming